Concord is a census-designated place (CDP) in Appomattox and Campbell counties in the U.S. state of Virginia. The population as of the 2010 census was 1,458.

This town was a stop on the Southside Railroad in the mid-nineteenth century.   This became the Atlantic, Mississippi and Ohio Railroad in 1870 and then a line in the Norfolk and Western Railway and now the Norfolk Southern Railway. Sylvia Trent-Adams grew up on a farm in Concord.

Major highways
U.S. Route 460
Virginia State Route 24

Campbell County Board of Supervisors   
 Matt Cline - Concord

Nearby attractions
 Appomattox Court House National Historical Park
 James River State Park
 Smith Mountain Lake
 Leesville Lake
 Historic Lynchburg
 Lynchburg Hillcats (Minor League Baseball)

Demographics
As of the census of 2000, there were 3,657 people and 1,491 households residing in the ZIP Code Tabulation Area for Concord's ZIP code (24538).

Education
 Concord Elementary School

References 

Census-designated places in Campbell County, Virginia
Census-designated places in Appomattox County, Virginia